Gele may be:
Fongoro language (Chad)
Kele language (New Guinea)